Igarapé Gelado Environmental Protection Area is a protected area in the state of Pará, Brazil.
It contains cultivated land and Amazon biome.

Location

It is administered by the Chico Mendes Institute for Biodiversity Conservation.
It lies within the Parauapebas municipality of the state of Pará.

Conservation

The area is classed as IUCN protected area category V, protected landscape/seascape.
The purpose is to protect biological diversity and control human activities to ensure sustainable use of natural resources.
Protected species include Uta Hick's bearded saki (Chiropotes utahicki).

Notes

Sources

Environmental protection areas of Brazil
Protected areas of Pará
Protected areas established in 1989
1989 establishments in Brazil